Uvedalia is a genus of flowering plants in the family Phrymaceae, native to Australia. It was resurrected from Mimulus in 2012.

Species
Currently accepted species include:

Uvedalia clementii (Domin) W.R.Barker & Beardsley
Uvedalia linearis R.Br.

References

Phrymaceae
Endemic flora of Australia
Lamiales genera